Reynaldo Gaudencio Escobar Pérez is a Mexican politician who was Secretary of Government in the state of Veracruz, and was the state's general attorney, resigned on October 8, 2011.  He was also the former mayor of Xalapa...

See also 
 Veracruz state election, 2000

References

External links
  Reynaldo Escobar Declina a la diputacion
  5 Razones para no elegir a Reynaldo Escobar Pérez

Politicians from Veracruz
Living people
State political office-holders in Mexico
Year of birth missing (living people)
21st-century Mexican politicians
Mexican prosecutors